Guerrerostrongylus  is a genus of nematode worms. Species of  Guerrerostrongylus infect mostly the digestive tract of  sigmodontine and caviomorph rodents from South America. The genus is part of the subfamily Nippostrongylinae.

Species include:

Guerrerostrongylus uruguayensis Sutton and Durette-Desset, 1991 (type-species)
Guerrerostrongylus  zetta (Travassos, 1937)
Guerrerostrongylus  gomesae Simões, dos Santos and Maldonado, 2012
Guerrerostrongylus  ulysi Digiani, Notarnicola, and Navone, 2012
 Guerrerostrongylus marginalis Weirich, Catzeflis, and Jiménez, 2016

References 

Heligmonellidae
Rhabditida genera
Parasitic nematodes of mammals
Parasites of rodents